1187 Afra is a dark background asteroid from the central regions of the asteroid belt. It was discovered by German astronomer Karl Reinmuth at Heidelberg Observatory on 6 December 1929. The origin of the asteroid's name remains unknown.

Orbit and classification 

Afra is a non-family asteroid of the main belt's background population when applying the hierarchical clustering method to its proper orbital elements. It orbits the Sun in the central asteroid belt at a distance of 2.1–3.2 AU once every 4 years and 3 months (1,567 days; semi-major axis of 2.64 AU). Its orbit has an eccentricity of 0.22 and an inclination of 11° with respect to the ecliptic. The body's observation arc begins at Heidelberg in January 1930, seven weeks after its official discovery observation.

Naming 

It is not known to what person, group of persons, or occurrence the name "Afra" refers to.

Unknown meaning 

Among the many thousands of named minor planets, Afra is one of 120 asteroids, for which no official naming citation has been published.

Physical characteristics 

References

External links 
 Lightcurve Database Query (LCDB), at www.minorplanet.info
 Dictionary of Minor Planet Names, Google books
 Asteroids and comets rotation curves, CdR – Geneva Observatory, Raoul Behrend
 Discovery Circumstances: Numbered Minor Planets (1)-(5000) – Minor Planet Center
 
 

001187
Discoveries by Karl Wilhelm Reinmuth
Named minor planets
001187
19291206